Johanna Sjöberg (born 8 March 1978) is a Swedish former international swimmer, who won her first medal in 1997 at the European Swimming Championships in Seville; a bronze in the 100 m butterfly.

Clubs
Bromöllaortens SS
Helsingborgs SS
Södertälje SS
Spårvägens SF

External links
 Profile on FINA-website

References

 

1978 births
Living people
People from Bromölla Municipality
Swedish female butterfly swimmers
Olympic swimmers of Sweden
Swimmers at the 1996 Summer Olympics
Swimmers at the 2000 Summer Olympics
Swimmers at the 2004 Summer Olympics
Olympic bronze medalists for Sweden
World record setters in swimming
Olympic bronze medalists in swimming
Swedish female freestyle swimmers
Medalists at the FINA World Swimming Championships (25 m)
European Aquatics Championships medalists in swimming
Bromöllaortens SS swimmers
Helsingborgs SS swimmers
Södertälje SS swimmers
Spårvägens SF swimmers
Medalists at the 2000 Summer Olympics
Sportspeople from Skåne County